Sloane Stephens was the defending champion, but withdrew before the tournament began.

Lauren Davis won her first WTA title, defeating Ana Konjuh in the final, 6–3, 6–1.

Seeds

Draw

Finals

Top half

Bottom half

Qualifying

Seeds

Qualifiers

Qualifying draw

First qualifier

Second qualifier

Third qualifier

Fourth qualifier

References
 Main Draw
 Qualifying Draw

ASB Classic – Women's Singles
WTA Auckland Open